Navahı (also, Navagi and Pashaly) is a village in the Agsu Rayon of Azerbaijan.  The village forms part of the municipality of Qaraməmmədli.

References 

Populated places in Agsu District